Warwick Films was a film company founded by film producers Irving Allen and Albert R. Broccoli in London in 1951. The name was taken from the Warwick Hotel in London. Their films were released by Columbia Pictures.

Origins
The reason for the creation of Warwick Films was a combination of several economic factors in the 1950s.

 American film companies were forbidden by the Marshall Plan to take their film profits in the form of foreign exchange out of European countries.
 To use these profits in Britain, film companies would set up production companies using the required amount of British film technicians and actors to qualify as British productions in order to take advantage of the Eady Levy.
 At the same time Americans working outside the US for 510 days during a period of 18 months would not be taxed on their earnings by the Internal Revenue Service. Though this scheme was developed for the aid of American humanitarian workers redeveloping nations destroyed in World War II, agents discovered that Hollywood actors, directors and screenwriters would qualify for the tax break by working outside the US for the same period.
 Albert R. Broccoli, who wanted to become a producer, and Irving Allen, who had both produced and directed several films, discovered that they would have more creative freedom and control over their films by being based outside Hollywood.
 British labour and thespians were not only of high quality but also more economical to use than the conditions and salaries set by American film unions. Columbia Pictures agreed to match Allen and Broccoli's funding dollar for dollar; in other words for every dollar/pound the producers raised, Columbia would provide the same amount.

The Red Beret
Their first film based on a best selling book was The Red Beret (1953), based on Operation Biting. Originally Warwick arranged to do a two-picture deal with RKO, but that fell through and the company signed with Columbia.

Although the story was British, the producers decided to use an American star. Broccoli was a former agent who knew that Alan Ladd had left Paramount Pictures over monetary disputes. Ladd and Sue Carol, his agent and wife agreed to a three-picture contract with Warwick Films on condition that Ladd's personal screenwriter Richard Maibaum co-write the films.

The Red Beret was economically filmed with Parachute Regiment extras at their installations in England and Wales, under the direction of Terence Young. The film cost US$700,000 to make and grossed US$8 million worldwide leading to more Warwick films. (It also began a collaboration between Maibaum, Young and Broccoli that would lead to the James Bond films).

Two more with Alan Ladd
Warwick next two movies both featured Alan Ladd and were in the action genre directed by Americans: Hell Below Zero, a whaling drama based on a script by Hammond Innes, directed by Mark Robson; The Black Knight (1954), a medieval swashbuckler directed by Tay Garnett. Both movies were a success and Columbia signed another three-picture contract with Warwick. Broccoli said in a 1954 interview:
We're not making British pictures, but American pictures in Britain. We're trying to Americanize the actors' speech in order to make the Englishman understood down in Texas and Oklahoma – in other words, break down a natural resistance and get our pictures out of the art houses and into the regular theatres. And we're doing it. Furthermore, we'll soon be shooting all over the world, bringing to the public the beauty and scope of the outdoors in new mediums – real backgrounds, but always with an American star.
At this stage, Warwick's budgets were around $1 million a film with $200,000 allocated to the American star.

1955-57 Expansion
Warwick's next three films for Columbia were A Prize of Gold, The Cockleshell Heroes and Safari (1956). All followed the template of the first three films - action stories with American stars - with the additional element of being shot on location.

A Prize of Gold (1955) was a thriller starring Richard Widmark and directed by Mark Robson, partly shot in Berlin.

The Cockleshell Heroes (1955) was a war movie based on Operation Frankton filmed at RM establishments and in Portugal in 1955; the first British independent movie shot in CinemaScope, it starred Trevor Howard and Jose Ferrer, who also directed. It was the first screenwriting credit for Bryan Forbes. The movie was very popular in Britain but not in America.

Safari (1956) was set during the Mau Mau Rebellion, starring Victor Mature and Jennifer Leigh, directed by Terence Young. The movie was shot on location in Kenya. By this stage Columbia had agreed to finance additional movies from Warwick so it was decided to make Safari back to back with another adventure tale, Odongo (1956), starring MacDonald Carey and Rhonda Fleming, directed by John Gilling.

In 1956, Warwick negotiated producing nine films in three years for a cost of £6 million for Columbia Pictures. Warwick also arranged the shooting of several 30-minute films for television that would advertise Warwick's cinema releases.

Mature had signed a two-picture deal with Warwick. After Safari he made Zarak (1956), a British Empire tale shot in Morocco, directed by Terence Young with Michael Wilding and Anita Ekberg. The film was profitable.

Warwick's first non-action film was a science fiction story, The Gamma People (1956), but it still starred an American (Paul Douglas) and was shot on location (Austria). It was the first Warwick film in black and white.

Warwick signed a new three-picture deal with Victor Mature. The first of this was Interpol (1957), an action thriller shot in Europe, which reunited Mature with Anita Ekberg, and co-starred Trevor Howard; John Gilling directed.

Warwick's biggest budgeted movie to date was Fire Down Below (1957), an adventure film starring Rita Hayworth, Robert Mitchum and Jack Lemmon, directed by Robert Parrish. The shoot was difficult, being plagued by problems with its mercurial star Rita Hayworth, and led to a temporary strain in their relationship with Columbia Pictures.

At the end of 1956 it was announced Warwick would make thirteen films for a total of $18 million.

Warwick made its first comedy, the low budget How to Murder a Rich Uncle (1957), starring and directed by Nigel Patrick. It was their first movie without an American star.

High Flight (1957) was more traditional: an air force movie starring Ray Milland, directed by Gilling. So too was No Time to Die (1958) a war movie with Mature directed by Young. That was the last in a seven-picture deal Warwick had with Columbia.

In February 1957 Warwick announced their relationship with Columbia would finish at the end of the year. In October 1957 Warwick announced they would shift from continuous production to a per-picture basis and let go many of their permanent staff. They said after No Time to Die they would have finished their seven film obligation to Columbia. Production on The Man Inside was pushed back. Warwick said Zarak was profitable but Fire Down Below grossed $750,000 short of the amount to break even.

It was announced that Ladd would make three more films for the company, but he did not appear in another Warwick film. Two of the films were made with other actors, The Man Inside and Killers of Kilimanjaro.

The Man Inside (1958) starred Jack Palance and Anita Ekberg and was directed by Gilling.

1959–61 Final Years
Towards the end of 1959 Warwick announced they were reducing production to one film a year. "In five years costs have doubled and earnings have halved", said Allen at the time. "When those two graphs meet you're out of business" Warwick sold its office business in central London, disposed of technical equipment and terminated staff contracts.

Warwick adjusted its output during its final years. They made three lower-budgeted musical comedies starring Anthony Newley: Idol on Parade (1959), directed by John Gilling; Jazz Boat (1960), directed by Ken Hughes; and In the Nick (1960), also directed by Hughes.

Newley also had support roles in two more traditional Warwick movies: The Bandit of Zhobe (1959), starring Victor Mature, directed by Gilling, using footage from Zarak; and Killers of Kilimanjaro (1959) directed by Richard Thorpe, starring Robert Taylor. Many of these movies co starred Anne Aubrey.

Warwick's last film of note was The Trials of Oscar Wilde (1960) a biopic of Oscar Wilde directed by Hughes starring Peter Finch. The film was critically acclaimed but its financial failure contributed to the dissolution of Warwick.

Allen and Broccoli also had a disagreement about filming the James Bond series that Allen thought was beneath him. Broccoli was prevented from meeting Ian Fleming's representatives due to his wife's serious illness with Allen meeting them and insulting the Bond properties.

After several disagreements with Columbia Pictures, Warwick attempted to become independent distributors by taking over Eros Films an established British film distributor that distributed that film as well as Johnny Nobody.

Allen and Broccoli went their separate ways with Broccoli forming Eon Productions with Harry Saltzman to film the Bond series using many of the same crew from The Red Beret.

In 1962, Warwick Films announced they would make two films with Joan Littlewood but this did not transpire.

Philosophy
Irving Allen once espoused his philosophy behind filmmaking to a journalist in 1959:
If somebody sends me a literate script do you know what I do with it? I throw it in the waste paper basket, that's what I do with it. I make films to appeal to the lowest common denominator. That's why I'm still in business while the other arty-farty boys are not. I just want to make pictures to make money. That is a rat race and you can't afford to be a rat in a rat race... If I'm not tough I'm going to have my brains eaten out. The art of surviving in this business is never to let on whether you've got fifty million bucks or fifty cents... I wouldn't see my own films. I've got more taste than that. Does Barbara Hutton buy her jewelry at Woolworths?"We're not making British pictures but American pictures in Britain", said Broccoli.

Warwick's people

The director of the initial Warwick Films was Terence Young who not only directed several more films for the company but acted as an uncredited story editor for Warwick. The Red Beret also used Ted Moore as a camera operator and Bob Simmons as a stuntman who both would work on more Warwick productions as stunt man, stunt double and stunt arranger.

Mark Robson directed several films for Warwick. John Gilling wrote and directed several Warwick films as did Ken Hughes.

As a condition of doing his final film The Black Knight with Warwick, Alan Ladd insisted on Warwick employing his friend Euan Lloyd who worked as a publicity agent for the company and directed the short April in Portugal (1954). Later, Warwick used Victor Mature, Bonar Colleano, Anne Aubrey and Anthony Newley in several films.

Other British film technicians getting their start at Warwick were future art director Syd Cain, story editor Peter Barnes and sound editor Alan Bell.

Harold Huth was a director of the company from 1956 onwards.

Films

 The Red Beret (1953)
 Hell Below Zero (1954)
 The Black Knight (1954)
 A Prize of Gold (1955)
 The Cockleshell Heroes (1955)
 Safari (1956)
 Odongo (1956)
 Zarak (1956)
 The Gamma People (1956)
 Interpol/Pickup Alley (1957)
 Fire Down Below (1957)
 How to Murder a Rich Uncle (1957)
 High Flight (1957)
 No Time to Die /Tank Force (1958)
 The Man Inside (1958)
 Idol on Parade (1959)
 The Bandit of Zhobe (1959)
 Killers of Kilimanjaro (1959)
 Jazz Boat (1960)
 The Trials of Oscar Wilde (1960)
 In the Nick (1960)
 Johnny Nobody (1961)

Unmade films
Projects announced by Warwick but subsequently not made include:
 An Englishman in Las Vegas – a comedy starring Norman Wisdom and Anita Ekberg
 The Rolls-Royce Story – a comedy starring Cary Grant
The Death of Uncle George
Golden City
The Naked Lady
The Long Ships – originally announced for Warwick but later made by Allen in 1964
 Trail of the Badman – a suspense Western with Don Burnett
 It's Always Four O'Clock – script by Irwin Shaw starring Alan Ladd
 The Unloved – written by Celin Morris
 a version of Day of the Triffids by John Wyndham

References

External links
Warwick Films at IMDb

Film production companies of the United Kingdom
Mass media companies of England
British companies established in 1951
Mass media companies established in 1951
Mass media companies disestablished in 1962
1951 establishments in England
1962 disestablishments in England